Garth Dawson (born 17 October 1959) is a New Zealand former cricketer. He played 36 first-class and 22 List A matches for Otago between 1980 and 1985.

See also
 List of Otago representative cricketers

References

External links
 

1959 births
Living people
New Zealand cricketers
Otago cricketers
Cricketers from Invercargill